Liolaemus crepuscularis is a species of lizard in the family  Liolaemidae. It is native to Argentina.

References

crepuscularis
Reptiles described in 2006
Reptiles of Argentina
Taxa named by Cristian Simón Abdala